Andrey Strokin is a paralympic swimmer from Russia competing mainly in category S13 events.

Career 
Andrey has competed in three Paralympics in 2000, 2004 and 2008 winning multiple medals each time. In 2000 he finished in fourth in the  freestyle and set a games record in winning the  freestyle and a world record in winning the  freestyle. In the 2004 games he finished third in the 100m butterfly, won the 100m breaststroke in a dead heat and sop sharing the medal with Germany's Daniel Clausner, he also retained the gold in the 50m freestyle and 100m freestyle where he broke the games record. At the 2008 games he finished seventh in the 100m freestyle and won bronze in both the 100m butterfly and 50m freestyle where he swam quicker than the games record had been before the heats.

References

External links 
 

Paralympic swimmers of Russia
Swimmers at the 2000 Summer Paralympics
Swimmers at the 2004 Summer Paralympics
Swimmers at the 2008 Summer Paralympics
Paralympic gold medalists for Russia
Paralympic bronze medalists for Russia
Russian male butterfly swimmers
Living people
Medalists at the 2000 Summer Paralympics
Medalists at the 2004 Summer Paralympics
Medalists at the 2008 Summer Paralympics
S13-classified Paralympic swimmers
Year of birth missing (living people)
Paralympic medalists in swimming
Russian male freestyle swimmers
20th-century Russian people
21st-century Russian people